Josh Considine (born 2000) is an Irish hurler who plays for Limerick Senior Championship club Patrickswell and at inter-county level with the  Limerick senior hurling team. He usually lines out at midfield.

Career statistics

Honours

Ardscoil Rís
Dr. Harty Cup (2): 2016/2018

Patrickswell
Limerick Senior Hurling Championship (1): 2019

Limerick
All-Ireland Senior Hurling Championship (1): 2020
Munster Senior Hurling Championship (1): 2020
National Hurling League (1): 2020
Munster Senior Hurling League (2): 2020

References

2000 births
Living people
Patrickswell hurlers
Limerick inter-county hurlers